The Franklin O-540 (company designation 8AC) was an American air-cooled aircraft engine that first ran in the early-1940s. The engine was of eight-cylinder, horizontally-opposed layout and displaced . The power output was nominally .

Variants
8ACG-538 (XO-540-1)Geared propeller drive at 0.632:1,  at 3,200 rpm

8ACSA-538 (XO-540-7)Supercharged, 

8ACGSA-538 (XO-540-3/O-540-5) Supercharged and geared, at 3,200 rpm

Applications
Northrop N-9M

Specifications (8ACG-538/XO-540-1)

See also

References

Notes

Bibliography

 Gunston, Bill. (1986) World Encyclopedia of Aero Engines. Patrick Stephens: Wellingborough. p. 57

Franklin aircraft engines
1940s aircraft piston engines
Boxer engines